Steve Bannos (born August 5, 1960) is an American television and film actor, writer and photo dealer. As an actor, he often had cameos in Judd Apatow and Paul Feig films, and is also known for his portrayal of Frank Kowchevski on the short-lived NBC dramedy Freaks and Geeks.

Career
Bannos appeared in the films Spy, The Heat, Bridesmaids, Funny People, Superbad, The 40-Year-Old Virgin, Drillbit Taylor, Pineapple Express, and Unaccompanied Minors; and TV appearances in Love (TV series), Mike & Molly, Days of Our Lives, Eagleheart, The Mentalist and Without a Trace. Bannos also played the characters "Mr. Combover" and "Mr. Gross" on the Nickelodeon TV show, Ned's Declassified School Survival Guide.

Bannos also wrote for Freaks and Geeks, Disney's Recess, the Nicktoon Doug and was a four-time guest writer on Saturday Night Live.

Filmography

Film

Television

External links

1960 births
American male film actors
American male television actors
Living people
Place of birth missing (living people)
Male actors from Chicago
20th-century American male actors
21st-century American male actors
American television writers
Screenwriters from Illinois
American male television writers